The trilling shrike-babbler (Pteruthius aenobarbus) is a species of bird in the family Vireonidae. It is endemic to the island of Java.  Its natural habitats are subtropical or tropical moist lowland forests and subtropical or tropical moist montane forests.  It used to be considered the nominate subspecies of the chestnut-fronted shrike-babbler.

References

 Collar, N. J. & Robson, C. 2007. Family Timaliidae (Babblers)  pp. 70 – 291 in; del Hoyo, J., Elliott, A. & Christie, D.A. eds. Handbook of the Birds of the World, Vol. 12. Picathartes to Tits and Chickadees. Lynx Edicions, Barcelona.
Reddy, S. 2008. Systematics and biogeography of the shrike-babblers (Pteruthius): Species limits, molecular phylogenetics, and diversification patterns across southern Asia. Molecular Phylogenetics and Evolution 47: 54–72.
Rheindt, F.E., and J.A. Eaton. 2009. Species limits in Pteruthius (Aves: Corvida) shrike-babblers: a comparison between the Biological and Phylogenetic Species Concepts. Zootaxa number 2301: 29–54.

trilling shrike-babbler
Birds of Java
trilling shrike-babbler